This is a list of sovereign states and dependent territories in Asia. It includes fully recognized states, states with limited but substantial international recognition, de facto states with little or no international recognition, and dependencies of both Asian and non-Asian states. In particular, it lists 49 generally recognized sovereign states (all of which are members of the United Nations), two states with substantial but not general international recognition (of which one is a UN observer state), four largely unrecognized de facto states, and six dependent and other territories.

The 49 generally recognized sovereign states listed here include two countries that are generally classified as European or African nations but with portions of their territory being in Asia, while the two states with substantial but not general recognition are both fully encompassed in Asia. Though a majority of the Russian Federation's land area is located within Asia, it is generally considered a European country because of its historical, cultural, ethnic, and political ties to Europe. Its capital and largest city, Moscow is located within Europe, and the vast majority of its population lives within its European part. In addition, while Egypt extends into Asia through the Sinai Peninsula, it is generally considered to be an African country because most of its population and geographic area is in Africa.

Geographical boundaries of Asia 

The divisions between Asia and Europe occur at the Ural Mountains, Ural River, and Caspian Sea in the east, the Caucasus Mountains and the Black Sea, Bosporus Sea of Marmara, Dardanelles and the Aegean Sea in the south. Azerbaijan, Georgia, Greece, Kazakhstan, Russia, and Turkey all have territory in both Asia and Europe. Armenia and Cyprus are entirely in Western Asia but are socio-politically European countries and members of the Council of Europe, with Cyprus also being a member of the European Union.

The division between Asia and Africa is normally considered to be the Suez Canal, placing the Sinai peninsula (which is part of Egypt) in Asia. Therefore, Egypt, an African country, may also be considered to be a country in Asia.

The division between Southeast Asia and Australia/Oceania is disputed and currently placed somewhere between Java and New Guinea. Indonesia spans both areas, but is ordinarily considered to be an Asian country. East Timor is sometimes considered to be part of Australasia or Melanesia, but due to its being surrounded by Indonesia, and its once being politically part of Indonesia, it is generally considered to be in Southeast Asia. Papua New Guinea is occasionally thought of as a Southeast Asian country, but it is generally considered to be part of Australasia or Melanesia. The division between East Asia and Oceania is usually placed somewhere between the Japanese archipelago and the Northern Mariana Islands of Micronesia. Certain Japanese islands are often categorized as being within Micronesia due to non-continental geology and similar biogeography. The division between Asia and North America is considered to be the Bering Strait. Some of the Aleutian Islands, however, may be considered to be in Asia.

Sovereign states 

A sovereign state is a political organization with effective sovereignty over a population for whom it makes decisions in the national interest. According to the Montevideo convention, a state must have a permanent population, a defined territory, a government, and the capacity to enter into relations with other states. It is also important to note that these states were categorized accordingly independent of our endorsement or opposition to their statehood and is based solely on their de facto and de jure statuses

United Nations member states 
There are 49 Asian states or states with substantial territory in Asia in this list. All are members of the United Nations.

States with limited, but substantial, international recognition 
In this list, Palestine is a state with substantial international recognition and UN observer-state status but without practical control over tangible territory, while Taiwan is a de facto state with full practical sovereignty over its territory and unofficial ties with most of the international community but not widely recognized de jure. Although a founding member of the United Nations as the Republic of China, since 1971 Taiwan is no longer recognized by the United Nations.

De facto states with little or no international recognition 

The four de facto states on this list have little or no international recognition and are not members of the United Nations. All are defined as states by the declarative theory.

Dependencies and other territories 

The four territories in this list are controlled by a state of which they are not considered to be a part.

Special areas of internal sovereignty 

The following two entities are integral areas of their controlling state, but have a political arrangement that was decided through an international agreement.

See also 
 List of Asian countries by GDP
 List of predecessors of sovereign states in Asia
 List of states with limited recognition

Notes

References 

 
Asia-related lists
Lists of countries by continent

Asia